Hard Times is a 2005 Spanish drama film directed by Manuel Martín Cuenca from a screenplay by Martín Cuenca and Alejandro Hernández which stars Javier Cámara, Nathalie Poza, Eman Xor Oña, and Leonor Watling.

Plot 
Set in Madrid, the plot concerns about connected personal stories: those of a former inmate adapting to life out of jail (Mikel), a NGO worker (Ana), and a Cuban immigrant and smuggler of cigars and artwork (Carlos).

Cast

Release 
The film was presented at the 53rd San Sebastián International Film Festival in September 2005. It was theatrically released in Spain on 18 November 2005.

Reception 
Fionnuala Halligan of ScreenDaily deemed the film to be "nicely-modulated and finely-acted", considering that, despite its "downbeat perspective", Hard Times is a "rewarding and challenging" film.

Javier Ocaña of El País considered that even if, as almost always with choral stories, some of the stories work better than others, the whole is "very well crafted", underpinning a portrait of current-day sorrows "as real as it is pessimistic".

Accolades 

|-
| align = "center" | 2005 || San Sebastián International Film Festival || colspan = "2" | Sebastiane Award ||  ||  
|-
| rowspan = "3" align = "center" | 2006 || 20th Goya Awards || Best Actress || Nathalie Poza ||  || 
|-
| rowspan = "2" | 15th Actors and Actresses Union Awards || Best Film Actor in a Leading Role || Javier Cámara ||  || rowspan = "2" | 
|-
| Best Film Actress in a Leading Role || Nathalie Poza ||  
|}

See also 
 List of Spanish films of 2005

References 

Films set in Madrid
2000s Spanish films
2000s Spanish-language films
Films about immigration to Spain
Spanish drama films
2005 drama films